Quarry Bay is a station on the  and  of the MTR in Quarry Bay on Hong Kong Island. The station livery is teal green.

Location

As with all stations on the Island line, Quarry Bay is located on the northern shore of Hong Kong Island. Platforms 1 and 2 are built beneath King's Road to Pak Fuk Road. Platforms 3 and 4 are built beneath King's Road to the south of Model Housing Estate.

History
In the course of constructing Quarry Bay station, with the initial two platforms, 70,000 cubic metres of rock was excavated and 28,000 cubic metres of concrete was poured. The station opened as part of the first phase of the Island line on 31 May 1985. The station was expanded in 1989 with the addition of platforms 3 and 4, which served as the terminus of  upon the opening of the Eastern Harbour Crossing.

The station was badly congested in the mid-1990s. The station had a capacity of 30,000 people per hour, and was "close to saturation". Contingency plans were developed to evacuate trains ahead of Quarry Bay to avoid overcrowding, while construction options were planned to alleviate the problem permanently. On 27 September 2001, the Quarry Bay Congestion Relief Works was completed, extending the Kwun Tong line to North Point station and providing an easier and more spacious interchange there for Central bound passengers. On 4 August 2002, the Kwun Tong line platforms began serving the newly opened  instead.

Station layout
The station is noted for having the deepest platforms in the MTR network by metres above sea level to allow the Tseung Kwan O line tunnel to traverse Victoria Harbour. They are also among the deepest by metres below ground level (although  and  stations are deeper) The station's concourses, however, are at ground level and open directly onto the street. As a result, four sets of escalators and many long passageways are necessary to connect the concourses to the deepest platforms. The walking time between concourse and Tseung Kwan O line platforms takes five minutes, therefore passengers are not allowed to enter the paid area of the station from seven minutes before the last train departs, which is different from the five minutes applied at other stations.

Since platforms 3 and 4 were built some time after platforms 1 and 2, no cross-platform interchange is available in Quarry Bay station. Commuters interchanging between the two lines have to walk through a long passageway and two flights of escalators for about five minutes to reach the platforms of the other line.

This inconvenience and increasing passenger numbers were what prompted the MTRC to undergo the Quarry Bay Congestion Relief Works, which extended the Kwun Tong line one station to the west to North Point station, where cross-platform interchanges are provided. The platform numbers of platforms 3 and 4 were switched when the Kwun Tong line was extended to North Point on 27 September 2001.

Entrances and exits
 A:  King's Road, Taikoo Place 
 B:  Finnie Street
 C:  Model Lane, Harbour Plaza North Point

Entrances/exits A and B share the same concourse while entrance/exit C has a separate concourse.

Shops
Circle K Mini-store
Hang Seng Bank ATM
Maxim's Cakes
2 Bank of China (Hong Kong) ATMs
An automatic photo machine (Max Sight Photo-Me)
A vending machine (Swire Coca-Cola)

Gallery

References

MTR stations on Hong Kong Island
Island line (MTR)
Tseung Kwan O line
Quarry Bay
Railway stations in Hong Kong opened in 1985
1985 establishments in Hong Kong